Sumner-Fredericksburg High School is a rural public high school located in Sumner, Iowa. It is one of four schools within the Sumner-Fredericksburg School District. It was a part of the Sumner Community School District until it consolidated with the Fredericksburg Community School District in 2014.

History
Sumner-Fredericksburg High School was established in 2004. It originated from the merger between the Sumner CSD and Fredericksburg CSD. Sumner-Fredericksburg High School is located in Sumner along with Durant Elementary School.

The schools' colors and mascot was chosen from a survey taken from all students in the newly combined district. From this survey, the students chose Cougars to be the mascot and the colors: Navy Blue, Forest Green, and Vegas Gold. In its first year, Sumner-Fredericksburg joined the Upper Iowa Conference which boasted Sumner's rival North Fayette and Fredericksburg's rival Turkey Valley. As schools in the Upper Iowa Conference continued to shrink and join together, Sumner-Fredericksburg received an invitation to join the North Iowa Cedar League. In 2014, Sumner-Fredericksburg joined the North Iowa Cedar League East Division, where it joined schools of similar size. In 2022, the school was invited to join the Upper Iowa Conference and the Northeast Iowa Conference. The school has yet to respond to both invitations.

Athletics and activities
The Cougars, a member of the North Iowa Cedar League, has the following athletics.

Football
Volleyball
2015 Class 2A Runner-Ups
Basketball
Wrestling (boys and girls)
Cross Country
Track and field
 Girls' 2018 Class 2A Runner-Ups 
Golf
 Girls' 2006 Class 2A State Champions 
 Girls' 2022 Class 2A State Champions 
Baseball
Softball
Bowling
Cheerleading
Soccer (Shared with Tripoli Community School District and Oelwein Community School District)
Sumner-Fredericksburg has the following activities/clubs.
FCCLA (Family Community Career Leaders of America)
Student Senate
Get A Grip
FFA (The National FFA Organization)
Speech (Individual and Group)
NHS (National Honor Society)
Instrumental Music (Marching Band, Pep Band, Jazz Band, Honor Band)
Choir
Sensations Show Choir
Spanish Club
Wellness Committee

See also
List of high schools in Iowa

References

2004 establishments in Iowa
Educational institutions established in 2004
Public high schools in Iowa
Schools in Bremer County, Iowa